Matthew O'Reilly (1 March 1880 – 13 November 1962) was an Irish politician. A farmer, he was first elected to Dáil Éireann as a Fianna Fáil Teachta Dála (TD) for the Meath constituency at the June 1927 general election. He was re-elected at each subsequent general election until lost his seat at the 1954 general election. He was educated at Castleknock College.

References

1880 births
1962 deaths
Fianna Fáil TDs
Members of the 5th Dáil
Members of the 6th Dáil
Members of the 7th Dáil
Members of the 8th Dáil
Members of the 9th Dáil
Members of the 10th Dáil
Members of the 11th Dáil
Members of the 12th Dáil
Members of the 13th Dáil
Members of the 14th Dáil
Politicians from County Meath
Irish farmers
People educated at Castleknock College